Thelethylax is a genus of flowering plants belonging to the family Podostemaceae.

Its native range is Madagascar.

Species:

Thelethylax insolata 
Thelethylax isalensis 
Thelethylax minutiflora

References

Podostemaceae
Malpighiales genera